The Thomas Leiper Estate, also known as Avondale, is a historic estate located at Wallingford in Nether Providence Township, Delaware County, Pennsylvania.  It was built by Thomas Leiper around 1785, and named Strath Haven after Leiper's birthplace in Strathaven, Scotland.  The estate includes the following: the three-story, yellow stuccoed mansion house, "Fireproof" vault, communal outhouse, barn, carriage house, smokehouse, warehouse, tenant's house, and quarry. The local high school, Strath Haven High School, is named for the estate.

It was added to the National Register of Historic Places in 1971.

The Friends of the Leiper House offers weekend guided tours of the house from April through December.

See also 
Leiper Canal
Leiper Railroad
Strath Haven High School Wallingford Swartmore School District school in Nether Providence, named after the estate.
List of Registered Historic Places in Delaware County, Pennsylvania

References

External links

Nether Providence Township: Township Treasures, scroll to The Thomas Leiper House

Houses on the National Register of Historic Places in Pennsylvania
Historic American Buildings Survey in Pennsylvania
Museums in Delaware County, Pennsylvania
Historic house museums in Pennsylvania
Houses in Delaware County, Pennsylvania
National Register of Historic Places in Delaware County, Pennsylvania